Koden may refer to:

 Kodeń, a village in Poland
 Gmina Kodeń, the administrative district
 Koden Khan, a successor of Genghis Khan
 Koden, a Japanese company founded by Yoji Ito

See also 
 Coden (disambiguation)